The Triumph Six Cylinder or Triumph I6 engine is a cast-iron overhead valve straight-six engine produced by Standard Triumph.  It is an evolution of the Standard Motor Company's inline-4 Standard Eight, with the addition of two cylinders and a larger displacement.

Introduced in their Standard Vanguard Six in 1960, it was used in a wide range of Triumph vehicles, including the Triumph TR5, TR250, and TR6.

Origin

Standard Six engine
The six cylinder engine was developed from the Standard SC four  first used in 1960 in the Standard Vanguard Six, in which it had a  bore and a  stroke, giving a capacity of 1998 cc. It was also used in the Eight and the Ten.

The engine was next used in the Triumph Vitesse, a sports saloon based on the Herald, in 1962. In this application, the engine had a  bore, reducing displacement to 1596 cc. The Vitesse was given the two-litre engine with the 74.6 mm bore in 1966.

The Triumph 2000 replaced the Vanguard Six in 1963 when Leyland discontinued the Standard marque. The two-litre six was later used in the Spitfire-based GT6 coupé from 1966 to 1974.

Beginning in 1967, the engine was used in the Triumph TR5 and TR250 sports cars, replacing the Standard inline-four engine used in TRs from the TR2 to the TR4A. When equipped with the Lucas mechanical fuel injection system in the TR5, this new 2.5-litre version gave a claimed  at 5500 rpm. When tested on dynamometers, 110 to 130bhp at the crankshaft is more usual, and may explain Triumph's decision to fit the TR7 with a 2-litre slant-four engine, whose power output and hence performance were in fact similar to those of the earlier and ostensibly more powerful engine.

The fuel-injected 2.5 litre engine became available in the 2000 unit body as the 2.5 PI in 1968; this was supplanted by the twin-carburettor 2500 TC in 1974. The 2000 and 2500 TC were discontinued in 1977.

Technical
A partial chart of Triumph engine numbers is posted on the "Spitfire & GT6 magazine" site. However the capacity appears not to match the bore/stroke, or that published on other sites including the GT6 Ezine, hence the corrections in the tables below.

Engine Applications Chart

Factory Quoted Power Chart

Racing
Triumph raced Spitfires, and some early GT6 prototypes at Le Mans, with some good success, and later at Sebring but due to rule changes and the takeover by Leyland, this was not continued.

Replacement

After Triumph, and later Rover, were absorbed into Leyland Motors in 1960, and 1967 respectively, work began on a successor to both the Triumph 2000 and the Rover P6 which would also use a new straight six engine design.  The engine, known internally as the Leyland PE166 was originally intended to be a development of the Triumph I6, but ended up becoming an entirely new design, with almost no interchangeable parts with the original.  The Rover SD1 was the only recipient of this engine in both 2.3L and 2.6L capacities.

Notes

References

I6
Standard Motor Company engines
Straight-six engines
Gasoline engines by model